is a Japanese professional shogi player, ranked 6-dan. Segawa is notable for becoming a professional player without being promoted by winning the 3-dan tournament within the professional apprenticeship program.

Shogi professional

Becoming a professional shogi player
Segawa was a 3-dan ranked apprentice shogi professional, but was unable to gain promotion to 4-dan professional before turning 26 in 1996. Thus, per the association's rules, he was required to withdraw from its apprentice school. Segawa continued to play shogi as an amateur and won a number of national amateur tournaments which allowed him to qualify for entry into professional shogi tournaments. Segawa's record of 17 wins and 7 losses against professionals in these tournaments led him to request that the association grant him another opportunity to become a professional. The JSA discussed Segawa's petition at its annual general meeting in May 2005, and the membership voted 129 to 52 to grant him a special exception to attempt to become a professional.

The JSA arranged for him to play six games against a variety of professional opponents, stating that he would be granted 4-dan professional status if he won three games. Segawa's opponents were to be four professional players (Hiromitsu Kanki, Toshiaki Kubo and Makoto Nakahara and Kunio Yonenaga), one female professional player (Hiroe Nakai), and one apprentice school 3-dan (Amahiko Satō).

The games were held from July to November 2005. Segawa lost Game One against Satō, won Game Two against Kanki, lost Game Three against Kubo, and then won Game Four against Nakai. His opponent for Game Five was originally scheduled to be Nakahara, but he was replaced by Hideyuki Takano. Segawa defeated Takano to achieve the necessary third win on November 6, 2005 and was granted professional status by the JSA on the same day. He became the first person in 61 years to obtain professional status via test shogi.

As a result of Segawa's successful attempt to become professional, the matter was re-discussed by the JSA members during the association's annual general meeting in May 2006, and the membership voted 154 in favor to 34 against to create a formal way for other strong amateurs to obtain professional status called the "Professional Admission Test".

Promotion history
The promotion history of Segawa is as follows:
 4-dan: November 6, 2005
 5-dan: August 13, 2012
 6-dan: November 8, 2018

The Miracle of Crybaby Shotan 
On September 7, 2018, the movie  directed by Toshiaki Toyoda about Segawa's life was released.

References

External links 

ShogiHub: Professional Player Info · Segawa, Shoji
Segawa's blog
 

1970 births
Japanese shogi players
Living people
Professional shogi players
People from Yokohama
Kanagawa University alumni
Professional shogi players from Kanagawa Prefecture